Max Schlosser may refer to:
 Max Schlosser (zoologist)
 Max Schlosser (tenor)